James Ricardo Forbes (July 18, 1952 – January 21, 2022) was an American basketball player. His college career at the University of Texas at El Paso was crowned by his membership of the U.S. national team in the 1972 Olympics and was part of the controversial 1972 Olympic Men's Basketball Final. Forbes and the rest of the team have never accepted the silver medal.

Life and career
Forbes was born in Fort Rucker, Alabama, on July 18, 1952. He attended Bel Air High School in El Paso, Texas. He was drafted by the Chicago Bulls in the fourth round of the 1974 NBA draft, but he never played professionally. Forbes was later an assistant coach for the UTEP Miners before going to coach high school basketball in El Paso. As a high school coach, he guided the Riverside Rangers to the Texas 5A Final Four in 1995 and the Andress Eagles to the Texas 5A Sweet Sixteen in 2009. Forbes has more than 700 career high school coaching victories. 

Forbes died from complications of COVID-19 in El Paso on January 21, 2022, at the age of 69.

References

External links
 

1952 births
2022 deaths
American men's basketball players
African-American basketball players
Basketball players at the 1971 Pan American Games
Basketball players at the 1972 Summer Olympics
Basketball players from Arkansas
Basketball players from El Paso, Texas
Chicago Bulls draft picks
Deaths from the COVID-19 pandemic in Texas
High school basketball coaches in Texas
Medalists at the 1972 Summer Olympics
Olympic silver medalists for the United States in basketball
Pan American Games competitors for the United States
People from Dale County, Alabama
Power forwards (basketball)
UTEP Miners men's basketball coaches
UTEP Miners men's basketball players